"Blessed" is a song by Swedish house producer Avicii (credited under the name Tom Hangs) featuring vocals from Shermanology. Like many of Avicii's early tracks this had been leaked on the internet between late 2010 to April 2011. The track was officially released on May 23, 2011 through Spinnin' Records. It was further released on March 6, 2012 in the United States, and then 3 months later in the United Kingdom on June 21, 2012.

The song was included on Dutch DJ Tiësto's Club Life: Volume One Las Vegas compilation. It was also featured on the Stolichnaya vodka TV advert aired during the UEFA Euro 2012 football tournament.

Track listing

Chart performance

Weekly charts

Year-end charts

Release history

References

2011 songs
Avicii songs
Songs written by Avicii
Song recordings produced by Avicii
Songs written by Arash Pournouri